Rollins Field was a stadium in Columbia, Missouri.  It hosted the University of Missouri Tigers football team until they moved to Memorial Stadium in 1926.  The stadium held 13,000 people at its peak.  It hosted the first homecoming in 1911.

References

Defunct college football venues
Sports venues in Missouri
Missouri Tigers football
Sports venues in Columbia, Missouri
1911 establishments in Missouri
Sports venues completed in 1911
Demolished buildings and structures in Columbia, Missouri
Demolished sports venues in Missouri